Mudda Mandaram is a 1981 Telugu-language drama film, written and directed by Jandhyala. It is the debut film for both the leading actors Poornima, It also stars Pradeep Kondiparthi, and Suthi Velu.This movie is inspired from 1971 English movie 'Friends'.

The Plot
Pradeep is son of a millionaire. He returns from America after his studies. He falls in love with a simple flower seller, Poornima. He marries her against the wishes of his father Shankar. How the young lovers survived facing the reality of life is the rest of the story.

Cast
 Poornima(debut)
 Pradeep (debut)
 Vinnakota Ramanna Pantulu
 Sundara Laxmi
 Shankar
 Annapurna
 Narasinga Rao
 Tulasi
 Suthi Velu

Soundtrack
 "Aliveni Aanimutyama' (Singers: S. P. Balasubrahmanyam, S. Janaki)
 "Jo Lali Jo Lali Nayana Okate Rendya Uyyala" (Singer: S. P. Balasubrahmanyam)
 "Jonnachelon Junnu" (Singers: S. P. Balasubrahmanyam, S. Janaki)
 "Mandaaram Mudda Mandaaram Mudduke Muddoche Mandaram" (Singer: S. P. Balasubrahmanyam)
 "Naa Sholapur Cheppulu" (Singer: Jitmohan Mitra)
 "Neelalu Kaarenaa Kaalaalu" (Singers: S. P. Balasubrahmanyam, S. Janaki)
 "Sreerastu Subhamastu Kalyanamastu" (Singers: S. P. Balasubrahmanyam, S. Janaki)
 "Kalakanthi Kolakullo" (Singers: S. P. Balasubrahmanyam, S. Janaki)
 "Aa Rendu Dondapanu Pedavullo" (Singers: S. P. Balasubrahmanyam, S. Janaki)

Boxoffice
 The film ran for more than 100 days in about 25 centres.

References

1981 films
Films directed by Jandhyala
Films scored by Ramesh Naidu
1980s Telugu-language films
1981 directorial debut films